The Man Upstairs is the twentieth studio album by Robyn Hitchcock. It was released on August 26, 2014 on the Yep Roc Records label. The album comprises ten acoustic songs, all produced by Joe Boyd, noted for his work with various folk acts in the 1970s.

It contains five original songs by Hitchcock and five covers of songs by the Psychedelic Furs, Roxy Music, Grant-Lee Phillips, Norwegian indie-rock band I Was a King, and The Doors. I Was a King's Anne Lise Frøkedal also plays guitar and sings vocal harmonies on the album. The album's cover was created by musician and artist Gillian Welch.

In 2020, Hitchcock released an album of outtakes from the Man Upstairs sessions, The Man Downstairs: Demos & Rarities.

Reception
The album was well received by critics: according to Metacritic, the album has received an average review score of 70/100, based on 17 reviews.

Track listing

Charts

References

2014 albums
Robyn Hitchcock albums
Yep Roc Records albums
Albums produced by Joe Boyd